Frederick Robinson (March 11, 1824 – April 11, 1893) was a British American immigrant, pharmacist, businessman, and politician.  He served four terms as Mayor of Kenosha, Wisconsin, and served in the Wisconsin State Assembly.

Biography
Robinson was born on March 11, 1824, in Church Stretton, in the West Midlands region of England. He was the youngest of nine children and his father died when he was only two years old.  At age 15 he became an apprentice to a druggist and learned under him for five years.

In 1845, he emigrated by boat to America. He landed in New York City after a forty day trip and was soon employed at a drug store in that city. The following year, he moved to Chicago and took a job with Sidney Sawyer.  Sawyer wanted to establish a drug store in the city of Southport in the Wisconsin Territory (present day Kenosha, Wisconsin) and sent Robinson there to set up and run the store.  For the next four decades, Robinson would be the leading druggist in the city.  Later in life, he would invest in other businesses in the area, and would serve as president of the First Bank of Kenosha and the M. H. Pettit Malting Company. In addition to his business interests, he was a farmer, a member of the Knights Templar, and the Independent Order of Odd Fellows.

On October 3, 1852, Robinson married Ann M. Bertholf in Green Bay, Wisconsin. Frederick and Ann had seven children.  Their eldest daughter, Alma, married Ossian Marsh Pettit, the eldest son of fellow Kenosha Mayor, Milton Pettit.  Frederick Robinson died on April 11, 1893.

Public career
Robinson was elected to represent Kenosha County in the Wisconsin State Assembly during the 1872 and 1876 sessions. He was elected to one-year terms as Mayor of Kenosha in 1862, 1863, 1869, and 1879. He also served as a member of the Kenosha city council, a member of the school board, chairman of the Kenosha County Board of Supervisors, and Chief Engineer of the Kenosha Volunteer Fire Company. He was a Democrat.

He was instrumental in the passage of the 1882 Wisconsin Pharmacy Act (1882 Wisconsin Act 167), which established the State Board of Pharmacy to regulate the industry in the state, and was a member of the board until his death.  He also successfully advocated for adding a department of pharmacy to the University of Wisconsin.

Electoral history

| colspan="6" style="text-align:center;background-color: #e9e9e9;"| General Election, November 6, 1871

| colspan="6" style="text-align:center;background-color: #e9e9e9;"| General Election, November 2, 1875

References

People from Church Stretton
English emigrants to the United States
19th-century English people
Democratic Party members of the Wisconsin State Assembly
Mayors of Kenosha, Wisconsin
Wisconsin city council members
County supervisors in Wisconsin
Farmers from Wisconsin
1824 births
1893 deaths
19th-century American politicians